Illya Oleksandrovych Tymoshenko (born 7 March 1999) is a Ukrainian professional footballer who plays as a defender for Polish club KSZO Ostrowiec Świętokrzyski.

Club career
He made his Ukrainian First League debut for FC Volyn Lutsk on 30 July 2017 in a game against FC Avanhard Kramatorsk.

References

External links
 
 

1999 births
Living people
People from Korostyshiv
Sportspeople from Zhytomyr Oblast
Ukrainian footballers
Association football defenders
Piddubny Olympic College alumni
FC Volyn Lutsk players
FC Olimpik Donetsk players
FC Polissya Zhytomyr players
FC Hirnyk-Sport Horishni Plavni players
FC Lyubomyr Stavyshche players
FK Ústí nad Labem players
KSZO Ostrowiec Świętokrzyski players
Ukrainian First League players
Ukrainian Second League players
Ukrainian Amateur Football Championship players
Czech National Football League players
III liga players
Ukrainian expatriate footballers
Expatriate footballers in the Czech Republic
Expatriate footballers in Poland
Ukrainian expatriate sportspeople in the Czech Republic
Ukrainian expatriate sportspeople in Poland